Joseba Zubeldia Agirre (born 19 March 1979 in Usurbil, Basque Country) is a Spanish former professional road bicycle racer, who rode professionally between 2002 and 2007, entirely for UCI ProTeam . He is the younger brother of fellow racing cyclist Haimar Zubeldia.

References

External links 
Profile at Euskaltel-Euskadi official website 

Cyclists from the Basque Country (autonomous community)
Spanish male cyclists
1979 births
Living people
People from Usurbil
Sportspeople from Gipuzkoa